Nights Like These is an American metal band from Memphis, Tennessee, United States, heavily influenced by death metal and sludge metal.

Biography 
In 2006, Nights Like These released their debut, The Faithless, to overall positive reviews on Victory Records.  They released their most recent album Sunlight at Secondhand on October 16, 2007, again on Victory Records.
 
In 2008, the band went on hiatus for the first part of the year. It was later announced (via the band's Myspace) that drummer Patrick Leatherwood had left the band due to other commitments. The band announced that they were planning to scale back on touring and albums, as opposed to taking on a full-time touring schedule with yearly albums. The Victory Records website has taken off Nights Like These from their "Artist" page, this has since started a fire storm of rumors that the band and Victory have separated. On July 15, 2008, Nights Like These posted a Myspace blog confirming their split with Victory and their new drummer Todd Pasterniak. It was announced on October 5, 2009 on Myspace that members of Nights Like These were working on a new musical endeavor under the name Panther Piss. 
A release party for their 7" was held on March 6. As of 2013 the band is back together, playing a variety of shows in their hometown of Memphis.

Band members 
Billy Bottom - vocals (2003-2008, 2013–present)
Matt Qualls − guitar, vocals 
Derren Saucier − guitar
Sebastian Rios − bass, backing vocals (2003-2008, 2013–present) 
Patrick Leatherwood- drums, backing vocals (2003-2008, 2013–present)

Past members 
Anthoney Carter - guitar (2003-200?)
Buddy Forbess - guitar (200?-200?)
Todd Pasterniak - drums (2008)

Albums 
 The Only Clown I'm Down With Is Gacy (3-track EP, 2004) - Limited release
 God City Sessions - Unreleased (2005)
 The Faithless (2006, Victory)
 Sunlight at Secondhand (2007, Victory)
 Old Youth Culture (2015, Self Released)

References

External links 
 
MySpace page
Victory Records
Smith Seven Records

Heavy metal musical groups from Tennessee
American deathcore musical groups
Musical groups established in 2003
Victory Records artists
American sludge metal musical groups
Musical quintets
Musical groups from Memphis, Tennessee